The 24th Stinkers Bad Movie Awards were released by the Hastings Bad Cinema Society in 2002 to honour the worst films the film industry had to offer in 2001. Freddy Got Fingered received the most nominations with seven. All nominees and winners, with respective percentages of votes for each category, are listed below. Dishonourable mentions are also featured for Worst Picture (61 total).

Winners and nominees

Worst Film

Dishonourable Mentions 

 A.I. Artificial Intelligence (Warner Bros.)
 American Outlaws (Warner Bros.)
 The Animal (Sony)
 Blow (New Line)
 Bones (New Line)
 Bubble Boy (Touchstone)
 Captain Corelli's Mandolin (Universal)
 Corky Romano (Touchstone)
 Crocodile Dundee in Los Angeles (Paramount)
 Double Take (Touchstone)
 Dr. Dolittle 2 (Fox)
 Driven (Warner Bros.)
 Evolution (DreamWorks)
 15 Minutes (New Line)
 Ghosts of Mars (Sony)
 The Glass House (Sony)
 Hannibal (MGM)
 How High (Universal)
 I Am Sam (New Line)
 Jay and Silent Bob Strike Back (Miramax)
 Jeepers Creepers (MGM)
 Joe Dirt (Sony)
 Joe Somebody (Fox)
 Jurassic Park III (Universal)
 A Knight's Tale (Sony)
 Lara Croft: Tomb Raider (Paramount)
 Left Behind (Cloud Ten)
 Lord of the Rings: The Fellowship of the Ring (New Line)
 The Majestic (Warner Bros.)
 The Man Who Wasn't There (USA)
 Megiddo: The Omega Code 2 (TBN)
 Memento (Newmarket)
 The Mexican (DreamWorks)
 Monkeybone (Fox)
 Moulin Rouge! (Fox)
 Mulholland Drive (Universal)
 The Mummy Returns (Universal)
 The Musketeer (Universal)
 Not Another Teen Movie (Sony)
 O (Lionsgate)
 On the Line (Miramax)
 The One (Sony)
 One Night at McCool's (USA)
 Original Sin (MGM)
 Planet of the Apes (Fox)
 Pokémon 3 (Toho)
 Pootie Tang (Paramount)
 Rat Race (Paramount)
 The Royal Tenenbaums (Touchstone)
 Say It Isn't So (Fox)
 Scary Movie 2 (Dimension)
 Serendipity (Miramax)
 Summer Catch (Warner Bros.)
 Sweet November (Warner Bros.)
 Swordfish (Warner Bros.)
 Tomcats (Sony)
 Valentine (Warner Bros.)
 Vanilla Sky (Paramount)
 The Wash (Lionsgate)
 What's the Worst That Could Happen? (MGM)
 Zoolander (Paramount)

Worst Director

Worst Actor

Worst Actress

Worst Supporting Actor

Worst Supporting Actress

Worst Screenplay for a Film Grossing More Than $100M Worldwide Using Hollywood Math

Most Painfully Unfunny Comedy

Worst Sequel

Worst Song in a Film or Its End Credits

Most Intrusive Musical Score

Worst On-Screen Couple

Most Annoying On-Screen Group

Worst On-Screen Hairstyle

Most Annoying Fake Accent (Male)

Most Annoying Fake Accent (Female)

Most Unwelcome Direct-to-Video Release

The Founders Award ("What Were They Thinking?") 
 Sony Pictures and its fictitious movie critic David Manning

Films with multiple wins and nominations

The following films received multiple nominations:

The following films received multiple wins:

References 

Stinkers Bad Movie Awards
Stinkers Bad Movie Awards